Albertas Miškinis (born 12 April 1938 in Panevėžys District Municipality) is a Lithuanian politician. In 1990 he was among those who signed the Act of the Re-Establishment of the State of Lithuania.

External links
 Biography 

Lithuanian politicians
1938 births
Living people
People from Panevėžys District Municipality
Members of the Seimas
Lithuanian Democratic Party politicians